Kosmos 275 ( meaning Cosmos 275), also known as DS-P1-I No.5 was a satellite which was used as a radar target for anti-ballistic missile tests. It was launched by the Soviet Union in 1969 as part of the Dnepropetrovsk Sputnik programme.

It was launched aboard a Kosmos-2I 63SM rocket, from Site 133/1 at Plesetsk. The launch occurred at 16:00:08 UTC on 28 March 1969.

It decayed from orbit on 7 February 1970.

Kosmos 275 was the fifth of nineteen DS-P1-I satellites to be launched. Of these, all reached orbit successfully except the seventh.

See also

1969 in spaceflight

References

Spacecraft launched in 1969
Kosmos 0275
1969 in the Soviet Union
Dnepropetrovsk Sputnik program